The Anglican Church of St Katherine in East Woodlands, Selwood, Somerset, England was built around 1712. It is a Grade II* listed building.

History

The tower was built around 1712 but the rest of the building was replaced in 1880 to designs by John Loughborough Pearson in the English Gothic style.

The construction of the church was funded by the Longleat estate.

The parish and benefice is within the Diocese of Bath and Wells.

Architecture

The stone church consists of a two-bay nave and chancel, with north and south aisles, and a south porch. The tower has pilaster surmounted by pinnacles.

Inside the church is a 15th-century font.

References

Grade II* listed buildings in Mendip District
Grade II* listed churches in Somerset